Zarrinabad-e Olya (also Romanized as Zarrīnābād-e ‘Olyā; also known as Bālā Zarrīnābād and Zarrīnābād-e Bālā) is a village in Miandorud-e Kuchak Rural District, in the Central District of Sari County, Mazandaran Province, Iran. At the 2006 census, its population was 1,140, in 272 families.

References 

Populated places in Sari County